The 1999–2000 season was Società Sportiva Lazio's 100th season since the club's existence and their 12th consecutive in the top division of Italian football. In this season, Lazio won their second Scudetto of their history, and their third Coppa Italia, completing an historical double.

In Europe, Lazio was knocked out at the quarter-finals of the UEFA Champions League by Valencia but won the 1999 UEFA Super Cup against Manchester United.

Players

Squad information
Squad at end of season

Transfers

Winter

Competitions

Serie A

Results by round

League table

Results summary

Matches

Coppa Italia

Round of 16

Quarter-finals

Semi-finals

Final

UEFA Champions League

Group stage

Second group stage

Knockout phase

Quarter-finals

UEFA Super Cup

Statistics

Players statistics

Goalscorers
  Marcelo Salas 12
  Juan Sebastián Verón 8 (2)
  Siniša Mihajlović 7 (3)
  Simone Inzaghi 7 (1)
  Diego Simeone 6
  Pavel Nedvěd 5
  Alen Bokšić 4

References

S.S. Lazio seasons
Lazio
2000